Jack River may refer to:

 Jack River (Queensland), a tributary of the Normanby River in Queensland, Australia
 Jack River (East Gippsland, Victoria), a river in the Shire of East Gippsland, Victoria, Australia
 Jack River, Victoria, a settlement in the Shire of Wellington, Victoria, Australia
 Jack River (Wellington, Victoria), a river in the Shire of Wellington (after which the settlement is named)
 Jack River (musician), stage name of Australian musician Holly Rankin

See also 
 Jacks River
 Jock River